Joseph Henri Richard (February 29, 1936 – March 6, 2020) was a Canadian professional ice hockey player who played centre with the Montreal Canadiens in the National Hockey League (NHL) from 1955 to 1975. He was nicknamed "Pocket Rocket" after his older brother, Canadiens' legend and fellow Hockey Hall of Famer Maurice "Rocket" Richard. Henri won the Stanley Cup 11 times as a player, the most in NHL history. Richard and Bill Russell of the National Basketball Association are tied for the record of the most championships won by an athlete in a North American sports league.  In 2017, Richard was named one of the '100 Greatest NHL Players' in history.

Early life
Henri Richard was born on February 29, 1936, in Montreal, the seventh of eight children of Alice (Laramée) and Onésime Richard. His father worked as a machinist for the Canadian Pacific Railway, specifically at the Angus Yards. His older brother Maurice Richard played hockey for the Montreal Canadiens beginning in 1942, when Henri was six years old. Maurice Richard quickly became a superstar player for the Canadiens, earning the nickname Rocket Richard, and Henri Richard wished to emulate his brother and go into hockey. Henri joined the junior Montreal Canadiens as a 15 year old, and led the QMJHL in scoring for two consecutive seasons before being promoted to the NHL.

Playing career

Henri Richard began his professional career playing on the same team as his older, more famous brother; and comparisons between himself and his brother were easy to make. He was nicknamed "Pocket Rocket" while still a junior in reference to his brother's nickname "Rocket Richard," as well as the fact that Henri Richard was shorter than his brother.

The two Richard brothers' style of play was quite different. Maurice Richard was famous for driving at the net with brute force; however, Henri Richard preferred tactical playmaking and outthinking the opponent. Maurice shot left; Henri shot right. Maurice was a goalscorer who was the first to score 50 goals in 50 games, and led the league in goals on five occasions; Henri led the league in assists twice, in 1957–58 and in 1962–63. Maurice was strong; Henri was fast. However, they had one thing in common: both were willing to be physical on the ice.

Initially, Montreal Canadiens coach Toe Blake kept the two Richard brothers apart on the ice, fearing that his star Maurice Richard would give up goalscoring opportunities to his younger brother. However, one game against Chicago a couple of injuries forced Blake to play the Richard brothers together, and Henri assisted Maurice on a goal in the third period, and from then on he played the brothers together on a line with hall-of-famer Dickie Moore. Initially, Maurice would watch out for his brother, and go after anyone who pushed his younger brother around; but after Henri won a fight while Maurice was stuck in the penalty box, Maurice realized that his brother could take care of himself, and stopped looking out for him.  Toe Blake later said that playing with Henri forced Maurice to become a better player, and helped prolong Maurice's career. Later in 1958, when Maurice Richard was injured, Toe Blake moved Marcel Bonin to the line to take Maurice's place, and Henri Richard's line continued to produce goals, showing the world that Maurice Richard was not simply carrying his little brother.

The Canadiens won the Stanley Cup in each of Henri Richard's first five seasons, the longest championship streak in NHL history. Maurice Richard retired after the last of these titles in 1960, however even before then Henri Richard was recognized as a star in his own right. In 1957–58, he was named to the first All-Star team and in 1959 he was named to the second All-Star team; he was also named to the second All-Star team in 1961 and 1963. He scored the Stanley Cup-clinching goal at the 2:20 mark of the first overtime of game six in the 1966 Stanley Cup Finals against the Detroit Red Wings, when a pass bounced off of Henri Richard's body into the net while Detroit's goalie Roger Crozier was still sprawled out on the ice. In the 1971 Stanley Cup Finals, Richard scored the game-tying and Stanley Cup-winning goals in Game Seven against the Chicago Black Hawks.

Like his older brother, Henri Richard was an outspoken player especially in regards to perceived discrimination against French Canadians. However, while Maurice Richard was threatened with severe discipline on more than one occasion for his activism, the Quiet Revolution began in earnest in the years following the Rocket's retirement. This compelled anglophones to take francophone grievances much more seriously. The 1971 final was a particularly controversial moment for Henri Richard, as he was benched in Game 5 after accusing coach Al MacNeil of discriminating against French-speaking players on the team in an interview. The accusation resulted in MacNeil getting death threats and requiring a bodyguard for him and his family during Game 7. Henri Richard went on to call MacNeil "the worst coach I have ever played for." Despite winning the Stanley Cup, MacNeil was demoted to coaching the Canadiens' junior hockey team, the Nova Scotia Voyageurs; while after captain Jean Beliveau retired, Henri Richard was promoted to team captain.  MacNeil and Richard later reconciled.

Retirement and legacy

Henri Richard served as captain of the Canadiens in 1971 until his retirement in 1975, after his team was eliminated in the playoffs by the Buffalo Sabres. He was the ninth player to reach 1,000 career points, with 358 goals and 688 assists in 1,256 games. His 1,256 regular-season games played in a Canadiens uniform are a franchise record. Henri won the Stanley Cup 11 times as a player, the most in NHL history. Only one other athlete in North American professional sports has achieved winning eleven championships in his respective league—Bill Russell of the NBA's Boston Celtics. Henri also scored two Stanley Cup-winning goals, one of five players to have done so.

He always wore the number 16, which was retired on December 10, 1975, by the Canadiens in his honour; he insisted that the proceeds from his jersey retirement night be donated towards the construction of a gymnasium for an orphanage. He was elected to the Hockey Hall of Fame in 1979. In 1998, he was ranked number 29 on The Hockey News' list of the 100 Greatest Hockey Players. He would later serve as an ambassador for the Canadiens' organization. In 2015, it was announced that Richard had been diagnosed with Alzheimer's disease. He died on March 6, 2020, at the age of 84 due to complications of the disease, in Laval, Quebec.

Career statistics

Regular season and playoffs

Career statistics taken from NHL.com.

Achievements
NHL

Awards taken from EliteProspects.com.

See also
List of Stanley Cup champions
Notable families in the NHL
List of NHL players with 1,000 points
List of NHL players with 1,000 games played

References

Notes

Citations

Bibliography

External links

1936 births
2020 deaths
Bill Masterton Memorial Trophy winners
Canadian ice hockey centres
French Quebecers
Hockey Hall of Fame inductees
Ice hockey people from Montreal
Montreal Canadiens players
Montreal Junior Canadiens players
National Hockey League players with retired numbers
Stanley Cup champions